Minier is a French surname.

Origin
In French, the word means mining, in the sense of pertaining or related to mining.

Notable people
Notable people with this surname include:
 Christine Minier (born 1964), French singer
 Daniel D. Minier (1794–1849), American soldier
 Ethan B. Minier (1874–1958), American politician
 Karen Minier (born 1973), Belgian television presenter
 Nelson Minier, pseudonym of Adrien Stoutenburg (1916–1982), American writer
 Theodore L. Minier (1819–1895), American politician

See also
 Menier
 Meunier
 Mounier
 Munier

References